Republika FM1 Davao (87.9 FM) is a radio station owned and operated by the Philippine Broadcasting Service. Its studios are located at the Mindanao Media Hub Bldg., Carlos P. Garcia Highway, Bangkal, Davao City, and its transmitter is located at Shrine Hills, Matina, Davao City. This station airs from 5:00 AM to 9:00 PM daily.

History
87.5 MHz was used as a temporary frequency of Radyo Pilipinas Davao from February to August 2018, while conducting maintenance and transferring studios to the Mindanao Media Hub, to be located in Davao City.

FM1 Davao, the first regional FM station of PBS and FM1 Manila, was launched on August 1, 2018. It is being led by station manager Hariett Saniel (Joe Fisher); Maurice Abella, marketing manager and former Mix FM and Oomph Radio station manager, Joey Sy-Domingo.

In January 2020, however, the station went off-air for a month. FM1 resumed broadcasting at 87.9 MHz on February 3, 2020, the same date the City Government of Davao took over its former frequency.

On December 5, 2020, The studios of Republika FM1 Davao along with its sister station Radyo Pilipinas Davao transferred to the new home at the new Mindanao Media Hub in Bangkal, Davao City.

References

Radio stations in Davao City
Philippine Broadcasting Service
Radio stations established in 2018